Collaborationism in France during the Second World War is a book written by Bertram M. Gordon and published by Cornell University Press. The book explores the collaboration between French citizens and the Nazi German regime during World War II.

Reviews

Citation

Similar or related works
 Passivity, Resistance, and Collaboration: Intellectual Choices in Occupied Shanghai, 1937—1945 by Poshek Fu
 Vichy France: Old Guard and New Order, 1940-1944 by Robert O. Paxton

See also
 Collaboration with the Axis powers
 Vichy France

References

Notes

Citations

External links
 Bertram M. Gordon, Mills College · Research Gate
 Collaborationism in France during the Second World War, Google Books

1980 non-fiction books
English-language books
History books about fascism
History books about Nazi Germany
History books about the Holocaust
History books about France
History books about World War II